Carrier Airborne Early Warning Squadron 122 (VAW-122) was an aviation unit of the United States Navy in service from 1 September 1967 to 31 March 1996. Originally nicknamed the "Hummer Gators" and later as "Steeljaws" was a U.S. Atlantic Coast Carrier Airborne Early Warning Squadron stationed at NAS Norfolk.  During its 30 years of existence, the squadron was deployed around the world and saw action from Vietnam to Desert Storm, conducting operations from the Arctic to the tropics.

Squadron History

1960s 

1970s 
The squadron's next two deployments to the Mediterranean returned its crews to international crises—the 1973 Yom Kippur War and the 1974 Cyprus Crisis.

In April 1975, VAW-122 upgraded to the definitive E-2C Hawkeye.

1980s 
In 1982 VAW 122 deployed on board USS Independence and provided support to operations in Beirut, Lebanon. During the 1983 deployment, VAW-122 supported combat operations in Grenada and Lebanon, then on its last combat carrier deployment in 1991, supported Operation Provide Comfort over Iraq during and subsequent to Operation Desert Storm. Throughout its operational lifetime, VAW-122 participated in numerous cold-war, North Atlantic, Mediterranean, African, Indian Ocean, Eastern European, and Middle Eastern operations, supported several NASA Space Shuttle launches, and devised a variety of original operational tactics and procedures including ABCCC missions.

1990s 
VAW-122 made its first major counter-narcotic deployment as a squadron to the Caribbean and Central America in 1990, previously it had been smaller detachments of shorter duration beginning in 1983 with Operation Thunderbolt. In 1992 became permanently assigned to the role of counter-narcotic. By 1996, the unit had completed eight deployments in the Caribbean and Eastern Pacific areas, conducting some missions deep over South or Central America, and far into the Pacific Ocean—and was credited with the seizure of more than 16 metric tons of illegal drugs.

VAW-122 was disestablished at NAS Norfolk on 31 March 1996.  Its drug-interdiction mission and aircraft were assumed by VAW-77, stationed at NAS Atlanta.

Deployments
Deployments of the squadron

Notes

References

See also
History of the United States Navy
List of inactive United States Navy aircraft squadrons
List of United States Navy aircraft squadrons

Early warning squadrons of the United States Navy